State Route 257 (SR 257) is an east–west secondary state highway that traverses southern Robertson and western Sumner counties in Middle Tennessee.

Route description 
SR 257 originates at SR 49 near Coopertown. It traverses mainly rural areas of southern Robertson County, including its meeting with US 431. It crosses US 41 at Ridgetop.

SR 257 then closely follows the Robertson–Sumner county line along its way to the I-65 interchange. SR 257 ends at its junction with US 31W at Millersville, on the Sumner County side of the county line.

Major intersections

References

External links
Tennessee Department of Transportation

257
257
257